The Pim Fortuyn Prize has been an annual political award in the Netherlands which has been held since 2015. It is named after the late politician Pim Fortuyn.

According to the organizers, the award is intended for nominees who are "opinion makers, administrators or politicians who fight for free speech, dare to break through taboos and take a position in the social debate." One of its jury members is politician Joost Eerdmans.

Philosopher of law and columnist Afshin Ellian won the first edition on 15 May 2015.

Pim Fortuyn Prize recipients
2015: Afshin Ellian
2016: Leon de Winter
2017: Ebru Umar
2018: Theodor Holman
2019: John van den Heuvel and Paul Vugts
2020: Jort Kelder
2021: Fidan Ekiz
2022: Lale Gül

References

2015 establishments in the Netherlands
Awards established in 2015
Politics of the Netherlands